Steed Lord is an Icelandic electronic house trio from Reykjavík, Iceland. The group is made up of three members, Svala, Mega, and Demo.

Music career

Inception
Before the group was formed, singer/songwriter Svala Björgvinsdóttir had become a household name in the Icelandic music scene after releasing her 2001 album, The Real Me. A year after she had stopped performing, she was given a house beat as a birthday present from a friend and this beat evolved into the band's first song; "You". The band would then write and record their second song Dirty Mutha, a week after releasing You.

Touring
Starting in 2006, they played shows in their native Reykjavík, and soon after they were being booked to perform over Europe and North America. They have played in Portugal, France, Italy, Germany, the Netherlands, Norway, Denmark, Sweden, and the United Kingdom. During their tour of North America, they performed live with artists such as Chromeo, Girl Talk, Vampire Weekend, Klever, and Does It Offend You, Yeah?. In the fall of 2009, Steed Lord was asked to open for Peaches for a run of dates in Southern California. Additionally, they have performed at festivals including Winter Music Conference in Miami, Electronic Betas Festival in Austria and South By Southwest in Austin, Texas.

2008 car accident
On April 9, 2008, Steed Lord was involved in a near-fatal car accident on their way to the Keflavik International Airport as they were about to depart for a tour of Norway and Sweden. Their car collided head-on with another car coming from the opposite direction on a narrow and icy road. The band was taken to the hospital and placed in the intensive care unit. Mega suffered life-threatening internal injuries and had to undergo multiple surgeries to recover;  Svala had internal bleeding, broken ribs, and minor back injuries.  The demo had to undergo surgery for internal bleeding. By the end of July 2008, still not entirely recovered from the accident, the band set out on their first proper tour.

Current status
In 2009, the band moved from Iceland to Los Angeles, however, they have since moved back to Iceland and they are currently on break, focusing on individual projects. The trio never officially disbanded, though they have not made any music together for a while and a lot of tracks, such as Stutter and Night Games, can no longer be found on their platforms.

Clothing line
In 2007, Steed Lord was commissioned by Sweden-based retail giant H&M to design a line for their Divided label. The Steed Lord / H&M designs were available in more than 50 countries. Additionally, Steed Lord is part of WeSC's “We Activist” program, and is featured in the print and video campaigns for the Swedish streetwear brand.

Discography
Albums
2008: Truth Serum
2010: Heart II Heart
2012: The Prophecy pt. 1

Mixtapes
2008: Beats & Blues: Live From The Big Apple
2008: Mixmag's Ed Banger Menage-A-Trois

EPs
2012: Precognition EP

Criticism
The bands first album, Truth Serum was reviewed in the Icelandic paper, Grapevine, which gave the album a poor review, saying; "The vocal effects and movie samples can’t quite disguise the fact that Steed Lord’s bark is a lot harder than their bite, and their desire to be stylish and relevant a lot more powerful their drive than to write a good song, which is kind of a shame; their songwriting, in the moments it does poke through, is pretty good. The fact that they still manage to be more interesting than other bands of their scene just says more about how useless their scene is."

Slugs front man Eldon also criticized the song Dirty Mutha as a rip-off of their track MTHRFCKR.

References

Icelandic electronic music groups
Icelandic musical trios
Musical groups established in 2006
Musical groups from Reykjavík